Sandro Continenza (13 July 1920 – 21 November 1996) was an Italian screenwriter. He wrote for 142 films between 1949 and 1982. He was born in Rome, Italy.

Selected filmography

 Toto Looks for a Wife (1950)
 Appointment for Murder (1951)
 The Angels of the District (1952)
 The Tired Outlaw (1952)
 The Dream of Zorro (1952)
 Neapolitan Turk (1953)
 If You Won a Hundred Million (1953)
 Funniest Show on Earth (1953)
 A Day in Court (1954)
 The Miller's Beautiful Wife (1955)
 Donatella (1956)
 Lucky to Be a Woman (1956)
 Totò, Peppino e la malafemmina (1956)
 I giorni più belli (1956)
 A Woman Alone (1956)
 Gerusalemme liberata (1956)
 The Day the Sky Exploded (1958)
 The Italians They Are Crazy (1958)
 Il vedovo (1959)
 Il Mattatore (1960)
 Hercules in the Haunted World (1961)
 Hercules and the Conquest of Atlantis (1961)
 Gladiators 7 (1962)
 I cuori infranti (1963)
 Agent 077: From the Orient with Fury (1965)
 Agent 077: Mission Bloody Mary (1965)
 Lo scippo (1965)
 Five Thousand Dollars on One Ace (1965)
 Heroes of the West (1965)
 Two Mafiosi Against Goldfinger (1965)
 Pleasant Nights (1966)
 Master Stroke (1967)
 Alibi (1969)
 The Cop (1970)
 The Things of Life (1970)
 Seven Murders for Scotland Yard (1971)
 Il domestico (1974)
 Let Sleeping Corpses Lie (1974)

References

External links

1920 births
1996 deaths
20th-century Italian screenwriters
Writers from Rome
Italian male screenwriters
20th-century Italian male writers